Krieg is a 2010 remix album by industrial rock band KMFDM containing remixes of songs from their 2009 album Blitz. Krieg was released exclusively on the band's own label, KMFDM Records, on 5 January 2010.

Reception

Krieg received positive reviews.

Track listing

References

 

KMFDM albums
2009 remix albums
Metropolis Records remix albums
Industrial remix albums